Tuyên Quang is a province of Vietnam, located in the northeastern part of the country to the northwest of Hanoi, at the centre of Lô River valley, a tributary of the Red River. Its capital is Tuyên Quang.

Tuyên Quang borders Hà Giang to the north, Cao Bằng to the northeast, Bắc Kạn and Thái Nguyên to the east, Vĩnh Phúc to the south, Phú Thọ to the southwest, and Yên Bái to the west.

History

Tuyên Quang, the capital city of the province has a rich history of the battles fought in the region. The earliest history is to the First Indochina War when it served as a garrison. During this war the Viet Minh made the Legionnaires surrender at the memorial to the Battle of Tuyên Quang. Another historical event is the Siege of Tuyên Quang, commemorated in the first verse of Le Boudin, its principal marching song. The French garrison posted at Tuyên Quang defended the town for four months against 12,000 troops of the Yunnan Army and the Black Flag Army. Two companies of the French Foreign Legion1 company of Tonkinese Tirailleurs, 31 naval gunners with four mountain guns, and eight sappers, commanded by Sergeant Bobillot, plus the gunboat Mitrailleuse. were involved during the Sino-French War (August 1884 to April 1885).

Tuyên Quang was once entirely settled by Thai people, but from the 13th century onwards were integrated into the Trần dynasty, who named it Quốc Oai before naming it Châu Tuyên Quang. After Lê Lợi expelled the Chinese and started the Lê dynasty, he made Tuyên Hóa a part of Tây Đạo. During the reign of Emperor Lê Thánh Tông, Tuyên Quang comprised one  and five districts and became the province of Minh Quang under the rule of Emperor Lê Uy Mục. During the reign of Lê Trang Tông, Minh Quang became An Tại, and control of the region was given to the Vũ family, ethnic Thai people.

By the end of the 17th century, the Lê dynasty sent ethnic Vietnamese officials to the area to supervise the Thais. People from the Thái, Mường, Mèo, Thổ, Nùng and another ethnic groups engaged the French in many battles in the area in 1884–1885. The Black Flags were also prominent. It was not until 1894 that the French had pacified the region. Prior to 1975, the province comprised the districts of Yên Sơn, Yên Bình, Hàm Yên, Sơn Dương, Chiêm Hóa and Đại Thi.

Geography and climate

The Tam Dao range is located in this province.

Its major tributary is the Gâm River on its left bank. The province has a land area . The province's territory has only 7.2% of natural forest comprising both rain forest and monsoon forest.

Water resources
The distribution of river and stream network in the province is 0.98 km/km2. There are three main rivers: Lô, Gâm and Pho Day. Its maximum flow is 11,700 m3/s, while the minimum flow recorded is 128 m3/s. It is a navigable river and is a major water route of the province to carry goods to other provinces. The second major river is the Gâm, which originates in China and flows through Cao Bằng and Hà Giang, before entering Tuyên Quang. The Gâm joins the Lô at Tu Hiep. The next major river of importance is the Pho Day River which rises in the Tam Dao Mountains in Bắc Kạn province. The navigation possibilities of this river are very limited. In addition to the three major rivers, there is an abundance of small rivers, lakes and ponds (2000 ponds). The total volume of surface water available from all these sources is estimated at 10 BCM. River water is potable, clear and tasteless, has a pH value ranging from 6.5 and 7.5. The underground water resources of the province, according to preliminary assessments done in the past, was about 3,500,000 m3/ngd. The water is potable with low mineral content. In addition, the province has three mineral water sources: two hot and one cool.

Mineral resources
 The province has rich metal-mineral and non-metal resources of
 Iron ore (10 iron mines with reserve of 10-13 million tonnes in Phuc Ninh, Ha Van, Thau Cay, Cay Vaum Cay Nhan, Dong Ky Lam, Lang Muong and Lang Lech
 Lead-zinc ore mines (24 mines) and ore sites at Thuong am-Son Duong, Dong Quan-Binh Ca, Nang Kha-Na Hang, Ham Yen-Bac Nhung, Ba Xu-Kien Thiet and Hung Loi-Trung Minh (Thanh Coc) with estimated reserves of lead–zinc (level C2)- 619,298 tonnes, Pl: 981,482 tonnes, level P2: 1,032,897 tonnes;
 Tin ore in Bac Lung, Ky Lam, Thanh Son, Khang Nhat (Ngoi Lem) and Ngon Dong with estimated reserves of 50,000 tonnes
 Vonfram ore with reserves of mineral sand ore of level Cl+ C2= 674 tonnes WO3
 Manganese at six locations in Chiêm Hoá, with reserves of (in zone of Lang Bai level Cl + C2)- 170,149 tonnes
 Antimony with reserves of 1,191,000 tonnes
Khuon Phuc, Lang Vai and Hòa Phú mines have also been explored with nine ore sites: Lang Can, Phieng Giao, Lang ai, Na Mo, Khuon Vai, Coc Tay, Nui Quit and Lung Luong, Nui Than. Barite has been found at 24 ore sites, which could be exploited by open cast mines, in Sơn Dương, Yên Sơn and Chiêm Hoá districts. Kaolin/felspar is found in Sơn Dương and Yên Sơn districts with estimated reserves of 5 million tonnes. Limestone in great abundance in the entire province, assessed to be of several billion cubic metres. Clay is well distributed in many areas with reserves of several million tons. Minerals such as pyrite, gold and pebble sand found in small quantities in the province.

Transport network
The province has no railway or airline links. However, the province has National Highway No. 2 and 37 road network. Major water transport routes are on the Lô, Gâm, and Pho Day Rivers which connect Tuyên Quang with neighboring provinces.

Climate
The tropical climatic seasons are the monsoon and dry season. Rainfall occurs generally during the monsoon months of May to October, which is also the summer season. However, it is unevenly distributed due to varying topography. Monsoon rainfall accounts for about 94% while the balance occurs during the dry months, which is the winter period. Depending on the season, the wind direction also varies significantly. Thunderstorms from April to August are also a climatic feature with maximum recorded rainfall of  during one thunderstorm in some areas. Cyclonic effects with wind speed reaching /s have been recorded in some areas. Cyclones occur every year during the transitional months between two seasons namely April and May. Other weather features noted are Mist and the hoarfrost; mist occurs at the beginning of the winter months; recorded for 25 to 55 days in the south and 60 to 80 days in the North. Hoarfrost occurs once every 2 years on average in January or November and for just one day.

The temperate to subtropical, tropical climate facilitates growth of natural flora and a diversified plant mechanism. The northern region of the province experiences a long winter with low temperatures. However, the region gets more rain during summer. The southern region has a diversified climate with a short winter and hot summer followed by a monsoonal season. Frequently, the strong intensity rainstorms result in floods, which occasionally cause damage to people and property.

Administrative divisions
Tuyên Quang is subdivided into seven district-level sub-divisions:

 Six districts:

 Chiêm Hoá
 Hàm Yên
 Lâm Bình
 Na Hang
 Sơn Dương
 Yên Sơn

 One provincial city:
 Tuyên Quang (capital)

They are further subdivided into five commune-level towns (or townlets), 129 communes, and seven wards.

Table of local government divisions

Demographics
The male population during this period was 395,146 with females accounting for 389,665. The rural population was 676,524 against an urban population of 108,287.

Languages spoken include the following:
Hmong-Mien languages
Hmong
Iu Mien
Kim Mun
Pa-Hng (Chiêm Hóa)
Tai languages
Tày
Nùng
Cao Lan
Kam-Sui languages
Kam (Chiêm Hóa)
Sui (Chiêm Hóa)
Chinese languages
San Diu (Cantonese)
Ngái (Hakka)
San Chay (Pinghua)

Economy and development

The province's economy is dependent on its primary industries. In 2005, the economic breakdown is as follows: construction 30.7%, services 33.6%, agriculture, forestry and fishery 35.7%. Rice is the staple food. Also grown are maize, cassava, potato, tea, lemongrass and citrus fruits, as well as beans. Livestock includes buffalo, pigs and poultry. The most important mineral reserves are zinc ore, manganese ore, tin and antimony. The province is also a producer of paper, cement and limestone.

The land economy is dependent on the agricultural growth in the province, which is dependent to a land area of ) under agriculture, about 20% of the province. However, this has also caused deforestation. However, the practice of shifting cultivation called the "swidden agriculture"(practiced by ethnic minorities) is limited to 3000 ha, as in 1992, and is said to be reducing under a UNDP funded project; has covered the aquaculture development in ponds. However, the Lô River which flows through the province has much potential for development of aquaculture.

The province has 900 villages in upland areas, which are inhabited mostly by impoverished ethnic minorities. Under an IFAD funded project for Rural Development (IFAD loan:US$20.9 million), agricultural training has been provided to the farmers on pilot plots to teach them to adopt new practices and techniques in the field of agriculture, animal husbandry, credit, food storage and processing that are appropriate for the local environment. In addition, infrastructure, health services and village level institutions like the savings and credit groups, user groups and village development boards have also been supported by this funding. The forestry sector of the economy is influenced by the Bai Bang pulp and paper mill, said to be one of the largest in Vietnam, located in the adjoining Vinh Phu Province. It was established in the 1980s with financial help from Sweden. Commercial logging is carried out in the plantation forests by the state-sponsored enterprises to supply pulp to the factory.

Economic indicators
As against the national figure of 7,592 agriculture, forestry and fishery cooperatives, there are only 147 agriculture cooperatives in the province (142 are farming and 6 are fishery cooperatives). There are 54 farms in the province compared to the national number of 120,699.

The output value of agricultural produce at constant 1994 prices in the province was 959.5 billion đồngs, compared to the national value of 156,681.9 billion dongs. The province produced 569,400 tonnes of cereals as against the national production of 324,200 tonnes.

In 2007, the industrial output of the province was a meagre 1102.7 billion đồngs against the national output of 1.47 million billion dongs.

Tuyên Quang hydroelectric plant

The Tuyên Quang Hydropower Plant, also known as Dai Thi, is a major hydroelectric power project located within the province on the Gam River near Pac Ta Mountain. Construction began on December 22, 2002, and the first unit was commissioned in March 2008 followed by the two other units by end of 2008. The power plant has a capacity of 342 MW (the second largest in the north), and has an energy generating potential of 1200 GWh/year. The project's estimated approved cost was US$490 million. It has a gross storage capacity of 2.3 billion cubic metres (BCM) (including 1 BCM of flood storage) on the Gâm River.

Biodiversity

Forest
Cultivated land including permanent cropland are mainly in the south of the province. The large closed forest is typical of the northern districts and is widespread in about 12% of the area. Bamboo forests are present recorded in all districts of the province, except Na Hang. The area of forests have reduced due to conversion into agricultural land or because they have become barren. However, this reduction could not be exactly correlated to the changes in the biodiversity of the province.

Flora and fauna
The province has a rich range of flora and fauna. Data compiled for the province has recorded flora from 90 families, 258 classes, and 597 species, and many of them are listed as endangered. The Vietnamese Red Book lists 18 scarce and precious plants in the province including aloe wood, pantace vietnamiensis, textured wood, limestone vatica, hoang dan and abony-tree.

There are 293 faunal species, of which there are 51 animal species belonging to 19 families; there are 175 bird species of 45 families; there are 5 reptile species and 17 amphibian species from 5 families. The animal species are found in abundance, although 39 animal species are listed in the scarce and precious category. Fauna in danger of extinction comprise 18 species of animals, 12 species of birds, 12 species of reptiles and one species of amphibian. The six mammal species particularly identified in the area are the tiger, the Asian black bear, the clouded leopard, the Indian muntjac (a small cervine), black gibbon, the apricot panther, the sambar (another small cervine) and the Sumatran serow (a small caprine). The primates identified are the Tonkin snub-nosed monkey and Phayre's leaf monkey; the last named is reported to be extinct. The habitat of the mammals, including primates, is stated to be shrinking due to deforestation and expansion of agricultural activities.

Historical places
Historical places in the province include the Cave Pagoda at Yên Sơn; the Dat Nong Tien and the Thuong Temple in Tuyên Quang. The natural beauty of the province is provided by the mountain ranges with peaks exceeding , and the My Lam Mineral Spring. There are 26 registered historical monuments, eight cultural centres and 42 communal cultural houses in the province. The predominant Christian churches in the province are the seven Roman Catholic churches; 60% of the province is believed to be Catholic.

Festivals
The popular festivals celebrated in the province are the Gieng Tanh village festival and the Qua Tang festival of the Dao people.

References

External links

Official Site of Tuyen Quang Government

 
Northeast (Vietnam)
Provinces of Vietnam

fr:Tuyên Quang